Jason Robert Collett is a Toronto-based Canadian singer-songwriter. He has released six solo studio albums, and is a former member of Broken Social Scene. His latest album, Song & Dance Man, was released in February, 2016.

Early life
Collett was born in Bramalea, Ontario, a Greater Toronto Area suburb.  He began writing songs at a young age to escape the boredom of his suburban life, and cites Bob Dylan, Kris Kristofferson and Nick Lowe as influences. Eventually, Collett moved to downtown Toronto where he worked as a woodworker and carpenter, doing renovations and custom home building, while he pursued his music. In the late 1980s, Collett co-founded the band Lazy Grace with Kathryn Rose and Kersti McLeod, performing every Monday at Toronto’s Spadina Hotel at the popular indie music gathering, Radio Mondays, alongside The Weakerthans and artists on the record label Arts & Crafts, who would perform and write songs together. Collett has mentioned how Radio Mondays were great community-building events, with five or six artists on stage at a time.  Around 2000, he was a part of the short-lived alternative country group Bird, of which Andrew Cash and Hawksley Workman were also members. Bird released one album, 2000’s Chrome Reflection.

Broken Social Scene
It was his work with Broken Social Scene that allowed Collett to give up woodworking and become a full-time musician. Collett became a member of Broken Social Scene, serving as one of their guitarists, after the band’s album You Forgot It In People. Collett was eventually convinced by Kevin Drew to join the band once they moved from a strictly instrumental band into one that wrote their own songs – "Digphilly". Though Collett took a break from touring with Broken Social Scene in the fall of 2005 to pursue his solo career and spend time with his family, Collett has made many musical connections through the band. His 2005 album, Idols of Exile, produced by Howie Beck, featured many prominent Canadian artists. Broken Social Scene’s Kevin Drew, Leslie Feist and Brendan Canning all contributed, as did members of bands Stars and Metric.

Solo work

Collett has released six solo albums. In 2001 he released Bitter Beauty;  in 2002 it was Motor Motel Love Songs. In 2005, he released Idols of Exile, his first on his current record label, Arts & Crafts; it was the same label to sign Broken Social Scene. Jason's Here's to Being Here was released in February 2008 and is different from Idols of Exile. Instead of a group effort, with many collaborating artists, Collett decided to focus on making an album that was meant to be played live. Collett tours under his own name with backing band The Dark Horse. In February 2008, Collett added Gregory McDonald, who plays keyboards with Sloan, and Jeremy Little, a bass player, to his touring band.  Formerly touring with backing band Paso Mino, made up of members Robbie Drake, Afie Jurvanen, Mike O'Brien and Michael P. Clive, Collett’s band has undergone many changes in recent years. For Collett's Wood Wires and Whiskey tour in Autumn 2008, the band consisted of Robbie Drake and Mike O'Brien, as well as newcomers Carlin Nicholson (also a member of Toronto acts Zeus and the 68's) and Neil Quin (also a member of Toronto acts Zeus, Major Grange and The Sexy Moving Parts). Zeus played as Collett's backing band for many tours as late as 2016.

In 2009, Jason Collett took part in an interactive documentary series called City Sonic.  The series, which featured 20 Toronto artists, had him reflecting on his longtime relationship with Kensington Market.

Collett's fourth solo studio album, Rat a Tat Tat (produced by O'Brien and Nicholson), was released in March 2010.

His firth solo studio album, Reckon was released in September 2012.  It follows the perspective of different lives in 2012 while striking upon issues dealing with the economic crisis, corporate bailouts, and dealing with the stress of it all.

Collett hosted The Courtyard Revue at Luminato Festival in June 2016 in Toronto.

He released his new, and sixth, album, Song And Dance Man on February 5, 2016.

In 2018, he contributed the song "Sensitive Man" to the compilation album The Al Purdy Songbook.

Personal life

Collett has lived in many neighbourhoods in Toronto, from Kensington to the Ossington and Bloor areas. Collett has been eating organic food since the mid-1990s and makes an effort to ensure that all the food on his tour bus is organic. Jason is also very politically involved. He is a member of Canada’s New Democratic Party and performed at an NDP kick-off rally in Toronto during the fall 2008 election. At a recent show at Queen's University, Collett expressed his displeasure for Canadian Prime Minister Stephen Harper. He also brought a petition to get Canadian citizen Omar Khadr released from the Guantanamo Bay detention centre where he had been kept for some time.

Discography
 2000: Chrome Reflection [Bird]
 2001: Bitter Beauty
 2002: Motor Motel Love Songs
 2005: Idols of Exile
 2008: Here's to Being Here
 2010: Rat a Tat Tat
 2010: Pony Tricks
 2012: Reckon/Essential Cuts
 2016: Song and Dance Man
 2022: Head Full of Wonder

See also
List of Canadian musicians

References

External links

Jason Collett's official site on Arts & Crafts
CBC Radio 3 Page on Jason Collett
Sloppy fun: An interview with Jason Collett (Nov 3, 2008) R4NT Magazine
Set of live videos and mp3 bootleg at scheduletwo.com
Jason Collett at Last.fm
Interview with Jason Collett at Bar Hop Sessions
Strangers Almanac Column on Jason Collett from Glide Magazine
Jason Collett performs at a New Democratic Party event
City Sonic: Jason Collett Film

Year of birth missing (living people)
Living people
Canadian male singer-songwriters
Canadian rock singers
Canadian country singer-songwriters
Musicians from Brampton
Musicians from Toronto
Canadian indie rock musicians
Arts & Crafts Productions artists
Broken Social Scene members
20th-century Canadian male singers
20th-century Canadian guitarists
21st-century Canadian guitarists
Canadian alternative country singers
Canadian male guitarists
21st-century Canadian male singers